Robert of Châtillon (died 1210), duke and bishop of Langres from 1205 until his death. He is also notable as a peer of France and a cousin of Bernard of Clairvaux.

References 

Bishops of Langres
12th-century births
1210 deaths
Year of birth unknown
13th-century peers of France